Buergenerula is a genus of fungi in the family Magnaporthaceae.

References

External links

Sordariomycetes genera
Magnaporthales